The 1938 Western Kentucky State Teachers Hilltoppers football team represented Western Kentucky State Teachers College (now known as Western Kentucky University) as a member of the Southern Intercollegiate Athletic Association (SIAA) during the 1938 college football season. Led by first-year head coach Gander Terry, the Hilltoppers compiled an overall record of 7–2 with a mark of 4–1 in conference play. Tom Triplett was the team's captain and Joe Gili was the alternate captain.

Schedule

References

Western Kentucky State Teachers
Western Kentucky Hilltoppers football seasons
Western Kentucky State Teachers Hilltoppers football